Emperor Hàm Nghi (lit. "entirely right", ; 3 August 1872 – 4 January 1943), personal name Nguyễn Phúc Ưng Lịch, also Nguyễn Phúc Minh, was the eighth emperor of the Vietnamese Nguyễn dynasty. He reigned for only one year (1884–85).

Biography
On 4 July 1885, a nationwide insurrection against the French broke out under the leadership of the two regents Nguyễn Văn Tường and Tôn Thất Thuyết. The French stormed the palace and Tôn Thất Thuyết took Emperor Hàm Nghi and three empresses into hiding. Hàm Nghi went to the hills and jungles around Laos along with Tôn Thất Thuyết's force. While they waged guerrilla warfare against the French occupation forces, the French replaced Hàm Nghi with his brother, Đồng Khánh, who was enthroned as the Son of Heaven. In October 1888, after a series of setbacks, Hàm Nghi was hiding in an isolated house near the spring of the Nai river, with Tôn Thất Thiệp, the second son of Tôn Thất Thuyết, and a few attendants. There, he was betrayed by the head of his Muong guards, Trương Quang Ngọc, and captured on 1 November, while Thiệp was killed. He was turned over to French officers on 2 November.

Exile and marriage
On 12 December 1888, he was exiled to Algeria. There he married a French Algerian woman, Marcelle Laloë, on 4 November 1904. They had three children, Prince Minh-Duc, Princess Nhu May and Princess Nhu Lý.

Death
Hàm Nghi died on 4 January, 1943, and was buried in Algiers. During his exile, he had bought the château de la Losse in Thonac, Dordogne, in southwest France. In 1965, Charles de Gaulle proposed to his daughter, Countess de la Besse, to transfer his body in Thonac, where he still lies in a simple grave. In 2002, Vietnam sent a delegation to France to seek permission from Princess Nhu Lý (De la Besse died in 2005, in her 97th year) to move her father's remains to the former Imperial capital of Huế. Her family has so far refused.

Honors
Some cities in Vietnam have streets named after him.

See also
 Algeria–Vietnam relations
 Giao Hoang, who was prime minister when the French took over
 Tống Duy Tân, who attempted to install Hàm Nghi as the leader of an independent Vietnam.

References

Bibliography
 Baille. "Souvenirs d’Annam 1886–1890" E. Plon, Nourrit et Cie, Paris (1890, viii + 266 pp.)
 Devillers, Philippe. "Français et Annamites. Partenaires ou ennemis? 1856–1902", Denoël, 1998, 517 pp.;  (2-207-24248-X)
 Gosselin, Charles. "Le Laos et le Protectorat Français". Librairie académique Didier, Perrin & Cie, Paris (1900, 349 pp.) Available  here or here
 Gosselin, Charles. "L’empire d’Annam". Préface de Pierre Baudin, Perrin. Cie: Paris (1904, xxvi + 560 pp.)
 Bergoend, Isabelle. "Le Dagobert optique". Editions Thierry Marchaisse (2015, 240 pp.)

External links
 

 
 

19th-century Buddhists
20th-century Buddhists
Algerian Buddhists
Vietnamese Buddhist monarchs
French people of Vietnamese descent
Algerian people of Vietnamese descent
Vietnamese nationalists
Vietnamese revolutionaries
Emperors of Nguyen Vietnam
Nguyen dynasty emperors
1872 births
1943 deaths
19th-century Vietnamese monarchs
Vietnamese monarchs